Reductoniscus costulatus is a species of woodlouse in the family Armadillidae. In the wild, R. costulatus has been found in Mauritius, the Seychelles and Hawaii, including the islands of Oahu and Kauai and Hawaii. It was discovered in the Palm House at the Royal Botanic Gardens, Kew in 1948, 1976 and 1988, and has been found in greenhouses across Europe.

See also
List of woodlice of the British Isles

References

Woodlice
Crustaceans described in 1930